A Double Life is a 1947 American film noir which tells the story of an actor whose mind becomes affected by the character he portrays. It stars Ronald Colman and Signe Hasso. It is directed by George Cukor, with screenplay by Ruth Gordon and Garson Kanin. Ronald Colman won the Academy Award for Best Actor for his performance in this film.

Plot
Celebrated stage actor Anthony "Tony" John, riding high on the success of his current comedy "A Gentleman's Gentleman", is offered the lead in a new production of Shakespeare's Othello by theatrical producer Max Lasker. Lasker also wants Tony's ex-wife, Brita, to co-star as Desdemona.

Tony initially declines the offer to the relief of director Victor Donlan, who knows that Tony becomes overly involved in his roles. Brita agrees with Donlan and warns press agent Bill Friend that although Tony's mood is delightful when appearing in a comedy, he is terrifying when appearing in a drama. She warns Friend that Tony becomes so immersed in roles, that they can take over his reality. Tony changes his mind after becoming obsessed with the idea of portraying Othello. Whilst contemplating the role, Tony meets waitress Pat Kroll at an Italian restaurant, and the two soon begin a casual affair. Brita reluctantly accepts the role of Desdemona and rehearsals begin. The production opens to rave reviews, but Tony gradually becomes absorbed in his role and begins to lose a grip on where the play ends and his real life begins. Tony sees jealousy as the key to his character.

Just before the 300th performance of the play, Brita shows him a locket Bill gave her for her birthday and this sparks jealous rages within him. That night, during Othello's "kiss of death" scene with Desdemona, Tony becomes overcome with the role and nearly chokes Brita to death. When the play begins its second year, Tony asks Brita to remarry him, but she refuses. Tony suspects Brita is in love with Bill.  Enraged, confused and delirious, Tony goes to Pat's apartment. The play and reality become conflated in his mind and he eventually kills Pat with Othello's "kiss of death." Tony returns to Brita's and falls asleep on her couch.

The next day, reporter Al Cooley offers Bill front page publicity for Tony's play by pointing out the similarities between Pat's murder and Othello's "kiss of death."  Tony is enraged when he sees the story, and physically attacks Bill. Bill suspects Tony is Pat's killer and goes to the police, only to find that Pat's drunken neighbor has been arrested for her murder. Tony demands Bill's dismissal, and Bill plans a short vacation. Bill tells Brita he loves her, but Brita does not return his feelings. However, Brita reveals to Bill that Tony left her home on the night of Pat's murder.

Bill hires an actress to dress up like Pat, including wearing Pat's distinctive earrings, and plants her as a waitress in the restaurant where Pat had worked. Bill invites Tony to the restaurant, and with police captain Pete Bonner watching. Tony becomes distraught upon seeing Pat's "double" and rushes out of the restaurant. Suspicious now, Bill and the police follow Tony to the theater. Standing in the wings, they watch the performance and are seen there by Tony. At the climax of the performance of Othello that evening, a guilt-ridden Tony stabs himself to death with a real dagger - at the point Othello does within the play. Backstage, bleeding from his self-inflicted wound, he confesses all and dies.

Cast

Production

The leading role had originally been slated for Laurence Olivier. Colman was initially anxious about doing Shakespeare on screen. To reassure him, Cukor told the actor that the film had been designed to get him a long-overdue Oscar (which he later won); Colman had been nominated three times before.

Miklós Rózsa's music, for which he won his second Academy Award, mixes his own modern idiom with passages in the Venetian style of the sixteenth century. The composer later adopted the title Double Life for his 1982 memoir to signify the division in his career between absolute music and Hollywood film scores.

Analysis

Julie Kirgo wrote that A Double Life is truly a picture of opposing forces, mirror images, and deadly doubles: "Anthony John is at war with Othello, the elegant world of the theater is opposed to the squalid existence of Shelley Winters' Pat Kroll, and illusion versus reality are all conveyed in opposing lights and darks of Krasner's luminous photography."

Adam Lounsbery wrote that "there are many things about A Double Life that don't exactly place it in the category of film noir, but the look of the film is pure noir. It's full of shadows, dramatic lighting effects, city streets at night, and cramped, dark rooms. There's a mounting sense of dread running through the film, and Krasner's cinematography is largely responsible for it."

Reception

Critical response
When the film was released, The New York Times film critic Bosley Crowther wrote, "We have it on the very good authority of Ruth Gordon and Garson Kanin, who should know—they being not only actors and playwrights but wife and spouse—that what seems a fairly safe profession, acting, is as dangerous as they come and love between people of the theatre is an adventure fraught with infinite perils. Especially is it risky when an actor takes his work seriously and goes in for playing "Othello." Then handkerchiefs and daggers rule his mind. At least, that is what is demonstrated in a rich, exciting, melodramatic way in the Kanins' own plushy production...George Cukor, in his direction, amply proves that he knows the theatre, its sights and sounds and brittle people."

Critic Jerry Renshaw wrote, "A Double Life is an unusually intelligent, literate noir that is a classy departure from the pulpy "B" atmospherics often associated with the genre. Keep an eye out for Paddy Chayefsky and John Derek in minuscule bit parts."

Accolades
Academy Awards
 Best Actor in a Leading Role – Ronald Colman (winner)
 Best Music, Scoring of a Dramatic or Comedy Picture – Miklós Rózsa (winner)
 Best Director – George Cukor (nominee)
 Best Writing, Original Screenplay – Garson Kanin and Ruth Gordon (nominees)
Golden Globes
 Best Actor – Motion Picture Drama – Ronald Colman (winner)

Others

The film is recognized by American Film Institute in these lists:
 2005: AFI's 100 Years of Film Scores – Nominated

See also
 Carnival (1921)
 Carnival (1931)

References

External links
 
 
 
 

1947 films
1947 drama films
American drama films
American black-and-white films
Film noir
Films about actors
Films based on Othello
Films featuring a Best Actor Academy Award-winning performance
Films featuring a Best Drama Actor Golden Globe winning performance
Films that won the Best Original Score Academy Award
Films directed by George Cukor
Films scored by Miklós Rózsa
Blackface minstrel shows and films
Universal Pictures films
1940s American films
1940s English-language films